"Showtime" is the official name of the marching band at Howard University in Washington, D.C.

History and appearances
The "Showtime" Band performs at all home football contests. In addition to performances at Howard, "Showtime" has a travel schedule that has included performances at numerous NFL games including: the Philadelphia Eagles, New York Jets, Buffalo Bills, Washington Redskins, Pittsburgh Steelers, and Baltimore Ravens, to name a few. These performances have received both national and international attention. Invitations were extended to participate in the 1990 Shrewsbury Music Festival in London, England, the Macy's Thanksgiving Parade in New York, Bermuda Day festivities in Bermuda, and the Inaugural Parade for President Barack Obama.

Rivalries
Showtime maintains rivalries with Hampton University's "The Force" Marching Band, North Carolina A&T's "Blue and Gold Marching Machine," and Morgan State University's "Magnificent Marching Machine."

Eligibility for membership
The "Showtime" Marching Band is open to all Howard University students. Admission into the Marching Band is by audition only. Students interested in joining the Marching band should contact the Director of Bands, Kelvin W. Washington.

Students who are interested in becoming an Auxiliary member of the band (Dancers - Ooh La La! Dance Line, Flag Corps - The Flashy Flags,) should also contact the Director of Bands.

Auditions
Students interested in joining the Marching Band should prepare an audition which contains the following:

Wind Instruments
- Major Scales
- Chromatic Scales
- A prepared solo which exhibits your best abilities on your instrument.

Percussion
- 40 snare drum rudiments
- A snare drum solo

Auxiliary
The auxiliary sections hold clinics and auditions twice a year. In the spring, current students (rising sophomores, juniors, seniors) interested in becoming a member must attend the week long clinic and audition before the directors. In the fall, only incoming freshmen and transfer students are eligible to attend the mini-clinic and audition."

Scholarships
Scholarships are available to instrumentalists who have been auditioned by the band directors. Scholarships are also awarded on a per year basis at the discretion of the directors based on playing ability and instrumentation until funds are exhausted.

The Directors
Kelvin W. Washington Director of Bands (as of 2019-- previously  Associate Director) 
Kelvin W. Washington is a native of Baton Rouge, Louisiana. He received both his undergraduate and graduate degrees from Southern University in Baton Rouge, Louisiana in Instrumental Music Education. Currently he is a Doctoral candidate at the American Conservatory of Music in Hammond, Indiana.

Mr. Washington began his teaching career at Livonia High School in Louisiana. He later moved to Detroit, Michigan where he was appointed Director of Bands at Nolan Middle School and McKenzie High School in 1987. In 1989 he accepted the position of Chief Arranger and Assistant Director of Bands at the University of Arkansas at Pine Bluff, where he was later appointed Director of Bands.

Now in his sixteenth year as the Conductor for the Howard University Concert Band and Associate Director of Bands, Kelvin Washington has served as clinician and adjudicator for a number of school music programs and festivals. As a professional instrumentalist, Mr. Washington has toured across the United States, Canada, Poland, England and Scotland.

In addition to his university responsibilities, Mr. Washington serves as Orchestra Director and Arranger for many church ministries within the Washington, DC metropolitan area. He is married to Dianna Washington (née Duckett) of Washington, DC. They have one daughter - SuMayah Flousell Washington."

Mike Fitzhugh, Associate Director as of 2019

References

Howard University
Mid-Eastern Athletic Conference marching bands
Howard Bison football